Tay Zar is a 1981 Burmese black-and-white drama film, directed by Myo Myint Aung starring Kawleikgyin Ne Win, Kyaw Hein, San Shar Tin and Swe Zin Htaik.

Cast
Kawleikgyin Ne Win as U Pe Win
Kyaw Hein as Tay Zar
San Shar Tin as Daw Tin Tin
Swe Zin Htaik as Sein
May Nwet as Daw Htway
Khin Nu Nu as Mya Yee
Myo Myo Soe as Too Mar
Eant Kyaw as Yin Maung
Kyaw Gyi as Soe Tint 
Htet Htet Khaing as Pu Sue Ma
Min Latt as Nga Soe Lay

References

1981 films
1980s Burmese-language films
Films shot in Myanmar
Burmese black-and-white films
1981 drama films
Burmese drama films